Fredrik Wesslau is a diplomat specialized in conflict resolution and post-conflict stabilisation.

Biography
Originally from Sweden, he has worked for the United Nations, European Union, and Organization for Security and Co-operation in Europe on the conflicts such as Kosovo, Georgia, Nagorno-Karabakh, and Sudan/South Sudan. He is currently working as Deputy Head of Mission for the European Union Advisory Mission in Ukraine.

Before that, he worked as Director of the Wider Europe Programme and Senior Policy Fellow at the European Council on Foreign Relations. He has served as a team leader and political adviser to the EU counter-piracy mission, EUCAP Nestor. He has also worked adviser to the EUSR for Sudan and South Sudan, Rosalind Marsden, on the peace negotiations between the two countries following the South's independence in 2011. He has also worked as Political Adviser to the EUSR for the South Caucasus 2008–2010 and as Special Adviser to the UN SRSG for Kosovo, Joachim Rücker, in the run-up to Kosovo's Declaration of Independence in 2008. Wesslau started his career as a journalist, writing mainly for the International Herald Tribune.

In May 2013, his book - The Political Adviser's Handbook - was published. The Handbook is a field manual for political advisers and political affairs officers working on conflict resolution and crisis management. It is being used in key international institutions such as the UN, NATO, OSCE, EEAS, and CPCC, as well as several foreign ministries and universities.

Wesslau holds two master's degrees from Sciences Po Paris and the School of International and Public Affairs at Columbia University, and an undergraduate degree in international relations from the London School of Economics.

References

Year of birth missing (living people)
Living people
School of International and Public Affairs, Columbia University alumni
Alumni of the London School of Economics
American diplomats